I Am Afraid is an Italian crime film directed by Damiano Damiani.

Cast 
Gian Maria Volonté as Brigadeer Lodovico Graziano
Mario Adorf as Judge Moser   
Erland Josephson as Judge Cancedda   
Angelica Ippolito as Gloria
Giorgio Cerioni as Major Masseria   
Rino Sentieri as Tognon    
Bruno Corazzari: Captain La Rosa 
Paolo Malco as Caligari     
Laura Trotter as Caligari's girlfriend   
Aldo Valletti as Prison governor   
Laura De Marchi as Elsa Maroni

Production
I Am Afraid was shot at Auro Cinematografica in Rome and on location in Rome.

Release
I Am Afraid was released theatrically in Italy on 6 October 1977 where it was distributed by C.I.C. It grossed a total of 1,708,460,918 Italian lira on its domestic release. The film was shown at the 1977 Taormina Film Fest.

Footnotes

References

External links

1977 films
Italian crime drama films
Films directed by Damiano Damiani
Poliziotteschi films
1977 crime drama films
Films scored by Riz Ortolani
Films shot in Rome
1970s Italian films